Dominik Kotarski (born 10 February 2000) is a Croatian professional footballer who plays as a goalkeeper for Greek Super League club PAOK.

Club career

Ajax
Kotarski with his local club NK Tondach Bedekovčina at the age of 6, and after impressing, moved to Dinamo Zagreb's academy in 2011. On 7 July 2017, he signed his first professional contract with Ajax but had to wait until he turned 18 to officially sign with the club, and he is contracted until 30 June 2023.

Kotarski made his professional debut for Jong Ajax in a 3–0 Eerste Divisie loss to Jong PSV on 30 March 2018. Kotarski was made the third keeper of the first team ahead of the 2018–19 Eredivisie season. Due to good health of first and second choice keepers André Onana and Kostas Lamprou, he continued to ply his trade with the reserves.

Gorica (loan)
On 16 June 2021 it was announced that Kotarski would be loaned to HNK Gorica on a season-long loan spell, competing in the 1. HNL, the top-tier of professional football in his native Croatia.This year he "wrote" 28 participations with Goritsa, keeping his home intact in 8 of them. Ajax and Gorica have reached an agreement for the transfer of Dominik Kotarski. The deadline for Gorica expired on 6/15, in order to take advantage of the purchase clause that had been entered to acquire Kotarski from Ajax, giving the amount of 1.2 million euros, with the people of the team being a little late due to a holiday and to finally pay the money.

PAOK
Οn 27 June 2022, Kotarski signed a four-year contract with Greek club PAOK.

International career
Kotarski is a youth international for Croatia, and was the standout player for the Croatia U17s at the 2017 UEFA European Under-17 Championship.

On 31 October 2022, Kotarski was named in Croatia's preliminary 34-man squad for the 2022 FIFA World Cup, but did not make the final 26.

Career statistics

Honours

Club
Ajax
 Eredivisie: 2018–19, 2020–21
 KNVB Cup: 2018–19, 2020–21
 Dutch Super Cup: 2020

Jong Ajax
 Eerste Divisie: 2017–18

Individual
UEFA European Under-17 Championship Team of the Tournament: 2017

References

External links
 
 
 UEFA U17 Profile
 PAOK Profile

2000 births
Living people
People from Zabok
Association football goalkeepers
Croatian footballers
Croatia youth international footballers
Croatia under-21 international footballers
Jong Ajax players
HNK Gorica players
PAOK FC players
Eerste Divisie players
Croatian Football League players
Super League Greece players
Croatian expatriate footballers
Expatriate footballers in the Netherlands
Croatian expatriate sportspeople in the Netherlands
Expatriate footballers in Greece
Croatian expatriate sportspeople in Greece